Mark Knowles and Daniel Nestor were the defending champions.  They finished runner-up this year.

Martin Damm and Radek Štěpánek won in the final 7–6(7–4), 7–6(7–5), against Knowles and Nestor.

Seeds

Draw

Draw

External links
Main Draw

Open 13
2005 ATP Tour